The Social Buccaneer is a 1923 American film serial directed by Robert F. Hill. The serial consisted of ten episodes and was based on the novel of the same name by Frederic S. Isham. The Social Buccaneer is now considered to be a lost film.

Cast
 Jack Mulhall as Jack Norton
 Margaret Livingston as Princess Elise
 William Welsh as Raymond Norton
 Harry De Vere as Harvey Vail
 Wade Boteler as Madison Ames
 Percy Challenger as Steele
 Lucille Ricksen as Lucille Vail
 Robert Anderson as Terry Malone
 Buck Connors as Phillip Dupre (as George Connors)
 Tom London as Louis Lenoir (as Leonard Clapham)
 Sidney Bracey as Bentley Craven
 Tote Du Crow
 Fontaine La Rue
 Scott Pembroke as Undetermined Role (unconfirmed)

Episodes
 Missing Millions 
 Secret Ally 
 Tell-Tale Coin 
 Spider's Web 
 Black Shadows 
 Into the Depths 
 A Kingdom at Stake 
 Treason 
 The Coronation 
 Justice Triumphant

See also
 List of film serials
 List of film serials by studio
 List of lost films

References

External links

1920s American films
1923 films
1923 crime drama films
1923 lost films
1923 romantic drama films
American crime drama films
American romantic drama films
American silent serial films
American black-and-white films
Films based on American novels
Films directed by Robert F. Hill
Lost American films
Universal Pictures film serials
Silent romantic drama films
Silent American drama films
1920s English-language films